Wiesław Adam Berger (6 June 1926 in Ostrava-Přívoz – 15 January 1998 in Ostrava) was a Polish writer connected with the Zaolzie region of Cieszyn Silesia.

Biography
Berger lived from 1927 to 1940 (and also several years after World War II) in the village of Dolní Bludovice. During World War II he was deported to Nazi Germany. Later he attended Cyprian Norwid Polish Liceum in Villard-de-Lans and another Polish school in Houilles, France; and after the war Juliusz Słowacki Polish Gymnasium in Orlová. Berger worked since 1948 as an electrician in the theatre in Ostrava. He was a member of PZKO (Polish Cultural and Educational Union) and several literary organizations.

Berger had unusual ability to rise above regional problems and he is notable among the Polish writers of Zaolzie, because his works were not so much influenced by regional themes. Berger often called for Polish and Czech cooperation and also often used French themes in his works.


Works

Short stories collections 
 Świerszcze w głowie (1979)
 Zmysły (1981)
 Idę. Concorde (1984)
 Most nad Łucyną (1987)
 Okay (1988)
 Marienbad (1995)
 Za późno (1996)

Footnotes

References 
 
 
 

1926 births
1998 deaths
Writers from Ostrava
Polish people from Zaolzie
Polish male writers